Kombio is a Torricelli language spoken by a decreasing number of people in Papua New Guinea, as people shift to Tok Pisin. It also goes by the name Endangen. Mwi dialect is divergent, but there is some degree of difficulty in comprehension between other major dialects as well (Wampukuamp, Yanimoi, Wampurun).

Pronouns
Kombio pronouns are:

{| 
! person !! singular !! dual !! paucal !! plural
|-
! 1st
| apm || antie || antarko || ant
|-
! 2nd
| yikn || yipmuie || yipmarko || yipm
|-
! 3rd
| kil || tuwie || tuarko || ti
|}

References

Bibliography
Henry, Joan. 1992. Kombio Grammar Essentials. Summer Institute of Linguistics.

Urim languages
Languages of East Sepik Province